Knockout Kid is an American pop punk band from Chicago, Illinois.

History
Knockout Kid formed in 2010. They signed to THC music in 2011 and released their debut EP, Your Name All Over It, the same year. In 2013, the band released their second EP, The Callback, via THC music and Ingrooves Fontana. The band released their debut full-length album, It Comes With The Job Description, the same year. In late 2013, Knockout Kid was featured on a four-way split with Traditions, No Tide, and Fourth and Goal.

In September 2015, Knockout Kid signed to Bullet Tooth Records. Their debut album on the label, Manic, was released on February 26, 2016.

In July 2020, Knockout Kid premiered the music video for Hero Insomniac, the title track off their latest album, which was self-released on July 31, 2020.

Band members
Current Members
Wade Hunt – Vocals
Jacob Fuerst – Guitar and Vocals
Brompton Jackson – Guitar and Vocals
Bryan Nunez – Bass
John Jacobs – Drums
Former Members
Evan Franklin – Vocals
Nick Collis – Bass
Karl Nicolov – Guitar
Mike Benyoussef – Bass
Touring Members
Alex Ceja – Bass (2016-2018)

Discography
Studio albums
It Comes With The Job Description (2013, THC Music)
Manic (2016, Bullet Tooth)
Hero Insomniac (2020, self-released) 
EPs
Your Name All Over It (2011, THC Music)
The Callback (2013, THC Music and Ingrooves Fontana)
Splits
Fourth and Goal, Traditions, No Tide, Knockout Kid - 4-way split

References

Musical groups from Chicago
Pop punk groups from Illinois